Michele Camporese (born 19 May 1992) is an Italian footballer who plays as a defender for  club Reggina.

Club career
Born in Pisa, Tuscany, Camporese is a product of Fiorentina's youth system. He made his debut for the Viola in the Coppa Italia tie against Empoli on 26 October 2010, replacing Alessandro Gamberini in the 66th minute and played the whole extra time. Fiorentina won the match 1–0 assuring qualification to the successive round; Camporese was cautioned in the added time of second half. On 20 November 2010, he made his Serie A debut, replacing the injured Cesare Natali at half time in the match against Milan in San Siro. In the next match he replaced suspended Per Krøldrup as starting centre back, partnered with Alessandro Gamberini against Juventus. On 13 February 2011 he scored his first goal in Serie A in a match won 4–2 against Palermo.

In November 2011 he signed a new 5-year contract with La Viola.

On 13 July 2013, Fiorentina confirmed on their website that Michele Camporese had joined Cesena on a season-long loan.

On 25 July 2015, Camporese departed Fiorentina for Empoli after spending five seasons in Florence. It was confirmed by Empoli that he had agreed a contract until 30 June 2018.

On 18 July 2019, he signed a 2-year contract with Pordenone.

On 31 January 2022, Camporese moved on loan to Cosenza.

On 20 July 2022, he signed a three-year contract with Reggina.

International career
Camporese has played for every Italy's youth team level, except for the U-20. With the Italy U-17 team he capped twice at the 2009 UEFA European Under-17 Football Championship qualifying round and another two times in the elite round. In the final tournament, his only appearance arrived as a second half cameo in the semi-final defeat against Germany U-17. He then started all four matches in 2009 FIFA U-17 World Cup, in which the Azzurrini bowed out from the competition after defeat against Switzerland in the quarter finals. With Italy U-19 he played all three matches of the 2011 UEFA U-19 Championship qualifiers.

Under the new regime of Ciro Ferrara, he received his first call-up for Italy U-21 in November 2010. He made his debut on 17 November 2010, replacing Riccardo Brosco in the first half of the friendly match, winning Turkey 2–1.

References

External links
 FIGC National Teams Archive 
 

1992 births
Living people
Sportspeople from Pisa
Association football central defenders
Italian footballers
Serie A players
Serie B players
ACF Fiorentina players
A.C. Cesena players
S.S.C. Bari players
Empoli F.C. players
Benevento Calcio players
Calcio Foggia 1920 players
Pordenone Calcio players
Cosenza Calcio players
Reggina 1914 players
Italy youth international footballers
Italy under-21 international footballers
Footballers from Tuscany